Leave Me Like You Found Me is a 2012 American romantic drama film written and directed by Adele Romanski and starring Megan Boone and David Nordstrom.  It is Romanski's directorial debut.

Cast
Megan Boone as Erin
David Nordstrom as Cal
Patrick Brice as Warren
Lee Lynch as Tony

Reception
Eric Kohn of IndieWire gave the film a B+.

References

External links
 
 

2012 directorial debut films
2012 films
American romantic drama films
Films set in California
2010s English-language films
2010s American films
2012 romantic drama films